Labdia is a genus of moths in the family Cosmopterigidae.

Species
 Labdia acmostacta Meyrick, 1932 (Java)
 Labdia acroplecta (Meyrick, 1915) (Sri Lanka)
 Labdia aeolochorda Meyrick, 1927 (Samoa)
 Labdia albilineella (van Deventer, 1904) (Java)
 Labdia albimaculella (van Deventer, 1904) (Java)
 Labdia allotriopa Meyrick, 1923 (Fiji)
 Labdia amphipterna (Meyrick, 1917 (India, Coorg)
 Labdia anarithma (Meyrick, 1889) (Australia, New Zealand)
 Labdia ancylosema Turner, 1923 (Australia, Northern Territory)
 Labdia antenella Sinev & Park, 1994 (South Korea)
 Labdia antinopa (Meyrick, 1917) (Sri Lanka)
 Labdia apenthes Turner, 1939 (Tasmania)
 Labdia aphanogramma Meyrick, 1931 (southern India)
 Labdia aprepes Bradley, 1961 (Salomon Islands)
 Labdia arachnitis (Meyrick, 1907) (Sri Lanka)
 Labdia aresta Turner, 1926 (Australia, Queensland)
 Labdia argophracta Turner, 1923 (Australia, Queensland)
 Labdia argyropla Meyrick, 1927 (Samoa)
 Labdia argyrostrepta (Meyrick, 1897) (Australia, New South Wales)
 Labdia argyrozona (Lower, 1904) (Australia, Queensland)
 Labdia arimaspia (Meyrick, 1897) (Australia, Tasmania)
 Labdia auchmerodes Turner, 1939 (Tasmania)
 Labdia autotoma (Meyrick, 1919) (Australia, Tasmania)
 Labdia bathrosema (Meyrick, 1897 (Australia, Queensland)
 Labdia bicolorella (Snellen, 1901 (Java)
 Labdia bitabulata Meyrick, 1935 (Taiwan)
 Labdia bryomima (Meyrick, 1897) (Australia, New South Wales)
 Labdia calida Meyrick, 1921 (Fiji)
 Labdia callibrocha (Meyrick, 1915) (India)
 Labdia calthula Turner, 1923 (Australia, Queensland)
 Labdia calypta Bradley, 1961 (Solomon Islands)
 Labdia caroli Koster, 2008 (India, Kashmir)
 Labdia catapneusta (Meyrick, 1917) (Sri Lanka)
 Labdia caudata (Meyrick, 1917) (Sri Lanka)
 Labdia caulota Meyrick, 1918 (South Africa)
 Labdia cedrinopa Meyrick, 1928 (New Hebrides)
 Labdia ceraunia (Meyrick, 1897) (Australia, Queensland)

 Labdia ceriocosma Meyrick, 1934
 Labdia chalcoplecta Turner, 1933 (Australia, Queensland)
 Labdia charisia (Meyrick, 1897) (Australia)
 Labdia chionopsamma (Meyrick, 1886) (New Guinea)
 Labdia chryselecta (Meyrick, 1897) (Australia, Queensland)
 Labdia chrysophoenicea (Meyrick, 1897) (Australia, Queensland)
 Labdia chrysosoma Meyrick, 1928 (New Ireland)
 Labdia citracma Meyrick, 1915 (India)
 Labdia citroglypta Meyrick, 1928 (New Britain)
 Labdia clodiana Meyrick, 1927 (New Hebrides)
 Labdia clopaea (Meyrick, 1917) (Sri Lanka)
 Labdia clytemnestra Meyrick, 1923 (Fiji)
 Labdia compar Meyrick, 1921 (Java)
 Labdia cosmangela Meyrick, 1923 (Australia, Queensland)
 Labdia cremasta (Meyrick, 1915) (India)
 Labdia croccocarpa Meyrick, 1928 (New Hebrides)
 Labdia crocotypa Turner, 1923 (Australia, Queensland)
 Labdia cyanocoma Meyrick, 1922 (Peru)
 Labdia cyanodora Meyrick, 1935 (India)
 Labdia cyanogramma (Meyrick, 1897) (Australia, New South Wales)
 Labdia deianira Meyrick, 1927 (Samoa)
 Labdia deliciosella Walker, 1864 (Australia)
 Labdia dicarpa Meyrick, 1927 (Samoa)
 Labdia dicyanitis Meyrick, 1934 (Rapa Iti) 
 Labdia diophanes Meyrick, 1928 (Zimbabwe)
 Labdia dolomella Bradley, 1961 (Salomon Islands)
 Labdia drosophanes (Meyrick, 1921) (India)
 Labdia echioglossa Meyrick, 1928 (Peninsular Malaysia)
 Labdia ejaculata Meyrick, 1921 (Australia, Queensland)
 Labdia embrochota (Meyrick, 1914) (Malawi)
 Labdia emphanopa Meyrick, 1922 (India)
 Labdia erebopleura Meyrick, 1922 (Borneo, Kalimantan)
 Labdia eugrapta Meyrick, 1927 (Samoa)
 Labdia eumelaena (Meyrick, 1897) (Australia)

 Labdia faceta (Meyrick, 1917) (India, Sri Lanka)
 Labdia fasciella Sinev, 1993 (Russian Far East)
 Labdia fletcherella Bradley, 1951 (India)
 Labdia gastroptila Meyrick, 1931 (India)
 Labdia glaucoxantha Meyrick, 1921 (Australia, Queensland)
 Labdia gypsodelta Meyrick, 1927 (Samoa)
 Labdia halticopa Meyrick, 1927 (Samoa)
 Labdia hastifera Meyrick, 1920 (Fiji)
 Labdia helena Meyrick, 1928 (New Ireland)
 Labdia hexaspila Turner, 1923 (Australia, New South Wales)
 Labdia hieracha (Meyrick, 1897) (Australia, Queensland)
 Labdia holopetra Meyrick, 1927 (Samoa)
 Labdia ilarcha (Meyrick, 1911) (the Seychelles)
 Labdia incompta (Meyrick, 1917) (India)
 Labdia inodes  Meyrick, 1922 (India)
 Labdia internexa Meyrick, 1927 (Samoa)
 Labdia intuens Meyrick, 1923 (Fiji)
 Labdia iolampra Meyrick, 1938 (China, Yunnan)
 Labdia ioxantha (Meyrick, 1915) (Sri Lanka)
 Labdia irigramma Meyrick, 1927 (Samoa)
 Labdia irimetalla Meyrick, 1933 (Zaire)
 Labdia irrigua (Meyrick, 1915) (Australia, Northern Territory)
 Labdia ischnotypa Turner, 1923 (Australia, Queensland)
 Labdia isomerista Bradley, 1961 (Salomon Islands)
 Labdia issikii Kuroko, 1892 (Japan)
 Labdia leptonoma Meyrick, 1927 (Samoa)
 Labdia leucatella (Snellen, 1901 (Java)
 Labdia leucombra (Meyrick, 1897) (Australia, Queensland)
 Labdia leuconota Turner, 1923 (Australia, Queensland)
 Labdia liolitha Meyrick, 1922 (India)
 Labdia macrobela Meyrick, 1918 (Mozambique)
 Labdia microchalca Meyrick, 1921 (Australia, Queensland)
 Labdia microdictyas Meyrick, 1923 (Fiji)
 Labdia microglena (Meyrick, 1915) (Sri Lanka)
 Labdia mitrophora Turner, 1923 (Australia, Queensland)
 Labdia molybdaula (Meyrick, 1915) (India)
 Labdia myrrhicoma (Meyrick, 1917) (Australia, Queensland)
 Labdia nesophora (Meyrick, 1897) (Australia)
 Labdia niphocera Turner, 1923 (Australia)
 Labdia niphostephes Turner, 1923 (Australia, Queensland)
 Labdia niphosticta (Meyrick, 1936) (Japan)
 Labdia niphoxantha Meyrick, 1930 (India)
 Labdia notochorda (Meyrick, 1907) (Sri Lanka)
 Labdia nutrix Meyrick, 1928 (India)
 Labdia ochrostephana Turner, 1923 (Australia)
 Labdia ochrotypa Bradley, 1961 (Salomon Islands)
 Labdia orthoschema Turner, 1923 (Australia)
 Labdia orthritis Meyrick, 1930 (Fiji)
 Labdia oxycharis Meyrick, 1921 (Java)
 Labdia oxychlora Meyrick, 1932 (Sierra Leone)
 Labdia oxyleuca (Meyrick, 1915) (Sri Lanka)
 Labdia oxysema (Meyrick, 1897) (Australia, Queensland)
 Labdia oxytoma (Meyrick, 1897) (Australia, Tasmania)
 Labdia pammeces Turner, 1923 (Australia, Queensland)
 Labdia pantopyrta Turner, 1923 (Australia, Queensland)
 Labdia paropis (Meyrick, 1915) (Sri Lanka)
 Labdia pentachrysis (Meyrick, 1931) (Java)
 Labdia petroxesta Meyrick, 1921 (Fiji)
 Labdia phaeocala Turner, 1926 (Australia, Queensland)
 Labdia picrochalca Meyrick, 1937
 Labdia pileata (Meyrick, 1897) (Australia, North South Wales)
 Labdia planetopa (Meyrick, 1915) (Sri Lanka)
 Labdia promacha (Meyrick, 1897) (Australia, New South Wales)
 Labdia properans Meyrick, 1927 (Samoa)
 Labdia psarodes Bradley, 1961 (Solomon Islands)
 Labdia pyrrhota (Meyrick, 1915) (Sri Lanka)
 Labdia rationalis Meyrick, 1921 (Fiji)

 Labdia redimita (Meyrick, 1917) (India)
 Labdia rhadinopis Turner, 1923 (Australia, Queensland)
 Labdia rhectaula Meyrick, 1927 (Samoa)
 Labdia rheocosticha Turner, 1923 (Australia, Queensland)
 Labdia saliens Meyrick, 1928 (New Hebrides)
 Labdia saponacea Meyrick, 1922 (India
 Labdia sarcodryas Meyrick, 1922 (India)
 Labdia scenodoxa Meyrick, 1923 (Fiji)
 Labdia schismatias (Meyrick, 1897) (Australia, Queensland)
 Labdia selenopis (Meyrick, 1905) (Sri Lanka)
 Labdia semicoccinea (Stainton, 1859) (India)
 Labdia semiramis Meyrick, 1930
 Labdia semnolitha Meyrick, 1928 (New Hebrides)
 Labdia sirenia (Meyrick, 1917) (Sri Lanka)

 Labdia sophista (Meyrick, 1917) (Sri Lanka)
 Labdia sphenoclina Meyrick, 1922 (India)
 Labdia spirocosma Meyrick, 1921 (Fiji)
 Labdia stagmatophorella Sinev, 1993 (Russian Far East)
 Labdia stibogramma Meyrick, 1924 (Malaya)

 Labdia symbolias (Meyrick, 1906 (Australia, Queensland)
 Labdia terenopa (Meyrick, 1917) (Sri Lanka)
 Labdia thalamaula (Meyrick, 1915) (Australia, Queensland)
 Labdia thermophila (Lower, 1900) (Australia, New South Wales)
 Labdia torodoxa Meyrick, 1928 (New Hebrides)
 Labdia tribrachynta Meyrick, 1928 (India)
 Labdia trichaeola Meyrick, 1933 (Java)
 Labdia triploa Turner, 1923 (Australia, Queensland)
 Labdia tristoecha Turner, 1923 (Australia, Queensland)
 Labdia trivincta (Meyrick, 1897) (Australia, New South Wales)
 Labdia xylinaula Meyrick, 1935 (India)
 Labdia zunobela Turner, 1923 (Australia, Queensland)

Selected former species
 Labdia philocarpa (Meyrick, 1921)

References
Natural History Museum Lepidoptera genus database

 
Cosmopteriginae
Moth genera